Hakea baxteri, commonly known as fan-leaf hakea
, is a shrub in the family Proteaceae native to an area in the Great Southern and Wheatbelt regions of Western Australia. A species noted for its foliage due to its fan-shaped leaves.

Description
Hakea baxteri is a non lignotuberous tall upright shrub  with smooth grey bark. Smaller branches and young leaves have densely matted soft rusty coloured hairs becoming smooth when flowering. 
The inflorescence consists of 4-8 small strongly scented flowers, light red with a green style. They form in clusters on an obscure stem in the leaf axils or on old wood. The large fruit have a roughish surface are globular shaped with a small hooked beak. Hakeas are characterised by their woody fruits, each seed pod containing two winged seeds.

Taxonomy and naming
Hakea baxteri was first formally described in 1830  by botanist Robert Brown and the description was published in Supplementum primum prodromi florae Novae Hollandiae. Hakea baxteri was named after William Baxter a 19th-century English botanical collector.

Distribution and habitat
Hakea baxteri grows in the Stirling Range National Park and nearby locations in heathlands and mallee on sandy-loam and gravel.

Conservation status
Hakea baxteri is listed as "not threatened" by Western Australian Government.

References

baxteri
Eudicots of Western Australia
Plants described in 1830
Taxa named by Robert Brown (botanist, born 1773)